Time for Beany is an American children's television series, with puppets for characters, which was broadcast locally in Los Angeles starting on February 28, 1949 and nationally (by kinescope) by the improvised Paramount Television Network from 1950 to 1955. It was created by animator Bob Clampett, who later reused its main characters for the animated series Beany and Cecil. The show won three Primetime Emmy Awards for best children's show.

History
Another character, a circus clown aptly named Clowny, appeared in early episodes, but was later unused.

The principal voice actors and puppeteers were Daws Butler (Beany and Captain Huff'n'puff) and Stan Freberg (Cecil and Dishonest John). The writers were Charles Shows, Bill Scott, and Adam Bracci. The puppets, created by Maurice Seiderman, were presented against simple sets or crude background drawings. After Butler and Freberg quit the show during 1952 or 1953, Jim MacGeorge, Irv Shoemaker and Walker Edmiston did the voice work and puppeting duties. Shoemaker assumed Freberg's roles, MacGeorge voiced Cap'n Huffenpuff, and Edmiston voiced Beany for a while, then left to do a new show Clampett had launched, whereupon MacGeorge and Dick Nelson began doing Beany's voice. Scatman Crothers voiced two characters for the show.

Premise
Time for Beany recounted the exotic voyages and landfalls of the ship Leakin' Lena as commanded by the sometimes inept "Uncle" Captain Huffenpuff. The daily episodes, each fifteen minutes in length, frequently contained topical references, usually of a satirical nature. One episode portrayed President Harry S. Truman in puppet form, accompanying Cecil's singing. Other characters spoofed popular entertainers; examples are Dinah Saur and The Red Skeleton, parodies of Dinah Shore and Red Skelton. Children could laugh at the silliness, and adults could laugh at the political and social satire.

Fandom
Albert Einstein was a fan of the show. On one occasion, the physicist interrupted a high-level conference by announcing, "You will have to excuse me, gentlemen. It's Time for Beany." Musician and composer Frank Zappa was also a fan,as was Harpo Marx, according to an interview with his son William Marx.

Popular culture
 The Animaniacs segment "Pinky and the Brain" paid homage to the show. In the episode "Puppet Rulers", Albert Einstein (who was a fan of Time for Beany) sits down with his nephew and niece to watch Time for Meany featuring Meany and Treacle (both voiced by Maurice LaMarche, who had voiced Dishonest John in the 1988 animated version of Beany & Cecil), which inspires Pinky and Brain to create a children's television show as part of a new plan to take over the world.
 Science fiction writer Larry Niven created an alien race he named Pierson's Puppeteers.  The creatures are so called because they have two one-eyed heads on the ends of tentacle-like necks, giving them a faint resemblance to Cecil the Seasick Sea Serpent.  A member of this race plays a major role in Niven's novel Ringworld.  Niven also gives the show brief mention in the novel Lucifer's Hammer which he co-wrote with Jerry Pournelle.

Videography
 Bob Clampett's Beany and Cecil: The Special Edition (Image Entertainment, 1999) (4 episodes)

References

External links
Toon Tracker

1940s American children's television series
1949 American television series debuts
1950s American children's television series
1955 American television series endings
Emmy Award-winning programs
American television shows featuring puppetry
Television series created by Bob Clampett
Nautical television series
Cultural depictions of Harry S. Truman
Beany and Cecil